Miloš Glišić (born 21 April 1998) is a Bosnia-born Serbian professional basketball player for Borac Čačak of the Basketball League of Serbia and the ABA League.

Early career 
Miloš Glišić was born in Banja Luka, Bosnia and Herzegovina. He started to play basketball for Ofy Basket Belgrade. In 2011, he joined the youth team of Partizan.

Playing career 
Glišić was added to the Partizan first team for their 2014–15 season. On 21 December 2014, he made a EuroCup debut with Partizan in a win against Asesoft Ploiești. He managed to score 2 points in that game. In 2016, he rejected to sign a professional contract with Partizan.

In April 2017, Glišić signed with for Vršac. In 2017–18 ABA Second League season, he averaged 11.5 points, 5.9 rebounds and 1.1 assists per game.

In April 2018, he joined Dynamic Belgrade. In September 2020, Glišić joined the Slovenian team Rogaška. He subsequently joined Metalac Valjevo where in four games he averaged 10.3 points, 7.0 rebounds, and 1.0 assist per game. On September 6, 2021, Glišić signed with Helios Suns of the Slovenian League. 

On September 9, 2022, Glišić signed with Borac Čačak of the ABA League.

National team career 
Glišić was a member of the Serbian U-16 national teams that won the bronze medal at the 2012 FIBA Europe Under-16 Championship and the silver medal at 2013 FIBA Europe Under-16 Championship. In 2012, over two tournament games, he averaged 3.5 points and 1.5 rebounds. In 2013, over nine tournament games, he averaged 14.0 points, 7.6 rebounds and 0.9 assists per game. He was named to the All-Tournament Team at the 2013 Championship.

He was a member of the Serbian U-18 teams that participated at the 2015 FIBA Europe Under-18 Championship and the 2016 FIBA Europe Under-18 Championship. In 2015, over nine tournament games, he averaged 7.7 points, 4.7 rebounds and 0.9 assists per game. In 2016, over six tournament games, he averaged 7.6 points, 6.8 rebounds and 0.7 assists per game.

He was a member of the Serbia U19 team that participated at the 2015 FIBA Under-19 World Championship. Over seven tournament games, he averaged 8.7 points, 4.9 rebounds and 0.7 assists per game.

Glišić was a member of the Serbia U20 team that participated at the 2017 FIBA Europe Under-20 Championship. Over seven tournament games, he averaged 11.9 points, 5.4 rebounds and 0.9 assists per game.

Career achievements and awards 
 FIBA Europe Under-16 Championship All-Tournament Team – 2013

References

External links 
 Profile at eurobasket.com
 Profile at FIBA Europe
 Profile at realgm.com
 Player Profile at nbadraft.net
 Player Profile at aba-liga.com

1998 births
Living people
ABA League players
Basketball League of Serbia players
Bosnia and Herzegovina expatriate basketball people in Serbia
Bosnia and Herzegovina men's basketball players
KK Borac Čačak players
KK Dynamic players
KK Metalac Valjevo players
KK Vršac players
KK Partizan players
Power forwards (basketball)
Serbian expatriate basketball people in Slovenia
Serbian men's basketball players
Sportspeople from Banja Luka
Serbs of Bosnia and Herzegovina
Helios Suns players